Beat the House is a casino video game series. Its first installment, Beat the House, was developed by Spirit of Discovery and published by Bridge Publications in 1992. The second game, Beat the House 2, was developed by Bridge Publications and published by Interplay in 1997.

Overview

Beat the House 2 features documentation written by gambling expert Avery Cardoza.

Reception

Beat the House

In 1994, PC Gamer US named the original Beat the House the 40th best computer game ever. The editors wrote that it "combines very powerful tutorials with great graphics and realistic action", and is "the best of the many casino sims out there."

Beat the House 2

In Computer Gaming World, Bernie Yee praised Beat the House 2s "authentic casino-style games and instruction for the serious player."

References

1992 video games
1997 video games
Digital card games
DOS games
Video games developed in the United States
Windows games
Multiple-game video board games